Zainal Anwar (born January 26, 1980) is an Indonesian footballer that currently plays for PSMS Medan in the Indonesia Super League.

Club statistics

References

External links

1980 births
Association football defenders
Association football midfielders
Living people
Indonesian footballers
Liga 1 (Indonesia) players
PSMS Medan players
Indonesian Premier Division players
Persikabo Bogor players
Persikota Tangerang players
Persipasi Bekasi players
Place of birth missing (living people)